The London Underground 1983 Stock was a class of electric multiple unit built by Metro-Cammell for use on London Underground's Jubilee line.

The 1983 Stock could be considered the last train to be designed by London Underground; it was the last conventional Tube train in the long line of evolving design since the 1938 Stock. The stock was built by Metro-Cammell to replace the 1972 Mark II Stock operating on the Jubilee line; in turn this was intended to enable those trains to replace the 1938 Stock on the Bakerloo line.

History
Design of the 1983 Stock was finalised in 1980; originally 30 trains were planned, but declining traffic meant that only 15 trains were ordered in 1982, entering service in 1984. An increase in passenger numbers meant that another 16 1/2 trains were built (called Batch Two) and these were delivered in 1988. All trains were formed of six carriages.

The 1983 stock owed much to the sub-surface D Stock in design. Like the D Stock, the 1983 Stock had single leaf doors, a similar orange interior and cab design. It also featured headlights that were positioned underneath the train body, and "bobbles on springs" strap-hangers for standing passengers within, the last new trains to have them. Unlike the D Stock however, the 1983 Stock proved to be unreliable. Electrical generators for lighting the carriages failed often, as did the motors. Boarding of passengers was slow because of the single leaf doors.

With the Jubilee Line Extension in mind, it was originally planned that the 1983 Stock would be heavily refurbished to run alongside the newer 1996 Stock that entered service on the Jubilee line in 1997; the plans included replacing the single leaf doors with double doors to speed up passenger boarding. The 1983 Stock was to be given similar interiors. This was abandoned due to the cost being only 10% cheaper than re-equipping the line entirely with the 1996 Stock. Then it was proposed for the 1983 Stock to be added to the refurbished 1973 Stock on the Piccadilly line and serve the Rayners Lane - Uxbridge section of the line. This was also abandoned on the grounds of cost. The last 1983 Stock train ran on the Jubilee line on 9 July 1998.

Despite their newness and attempts to sell the trains abroad, the trains never returned to service. A number were stored at various locations around the network, and others were scrapped. Since retirement from service, nine cars had been stabled at sidings south of South Harrow station (3639-4639-3739, 3640-4640-3740 and 3645-4645-3745). Over the years these had been heavily vandalised. With the introduction of Night Tube services, additional stabling was required, so all nine cars were removed over the weekend of 27/28 June 2015, and taken to CF Booth, Rotherham for scrapping.

Preservation
One carriage of the stock has been preserved by the London Transport Museum and another had been used as a studio by Radio Lollipop at Great Ormond Street Hospital, but this was recently scrapped. A few more have been placed on the disused Broad Street viaduct in Shoreditch for use as artists' studios.
List of preserved stock:
 DM 3734 at the London Transport Museum Depot.
 DM 3733 at Broad Street viaduct.
 T 4633 at Broad Street viaduct.
 T 4662 at Broad Street viaduct.
 DM 3662 at Broad Street viaduct.
 DM 3721 at Washington, Sunderland used as tunnel rescue training.
 The complete destination blind from DM 3702 exists in a private collection, and is in operational condition.

References

 Tubeprune - Rolling Stock

External links
 Squarewheels.org.uk - 1983 Tube Stock
  1983 Stock train at Charing Cross, Jubilee line platform, 1986.

1983
Metropolitan Cammell multiple units
Train-related introductions in 1984